Li Jing-lin, also known as Li Fangchen (1885–1931) was a deputy inspector-general and later army general for the Fengtian clique during the Chinese warlord era. He hailed from Zaoqiang County, Hebei province, China. After his military career was over he settled in Nanjing, and in 1927 moved to Shanghai. A renowned swordsman, he was known as "China's First Sword."

Military and administrative career
In 1924, during the Second Zhili–Fengtian War, Li was commanding the Fengtian Second Army which aided Zhang Zongchang in his decisive victory at Longku; the engagement has been termed "probably the single most important engagement in Zhili's defeat." In November his troops occupied Tianjin, where they picked up half of Wang Chengbin's forces, and under his command a "repressive and predatory" regime was established--especially noted is the extent to which the local merchants were extorted. The US 15th Infantry Regiment, whose mission was to keep the Peking-Mukden Railway open, was based in Tianjin, and small skirmishes occurred between US troops and Li's forces. Like many other warlords who ruled Tianjin, Li was a member of the Green Gang. From December 1924 to December 1925 he was the administrator of Hebei province.

Martial arts
One of Li's nicknames is "Magic Sword". He displayed great skill as a swordfighter and great interest in martial arts, especially Wudang chuan. Li was nicknamed "China's First Sword" and "God of the Sword." He was an expert in a variety of sword techniques, and later learned Wudang Sword from Sung Wei-I, a renowned swordsman who also taught Fu Chen Sung. His sword techniques were an amalgamation of the ancient Taoist and the newer Baguazhang styles.

After his military career he opened a martial arts center in Nanjing, and became vice-president of the National Martial Arts Academy, also known as Central Hall for National Martial Arts (Zhongyang Guoshuguan), and now called the Central Guoshu Institute. On his initiative, a Yang-style t'ai chi ch'uan was formalized, with Yang Chengfu as the most important of the contributors.

References
Notes

Bibliography

1885 births
1931 deaths
Chinese baguazhang practitioners
Chinese tai chi practitioners
Swordfighters
Republic of China warlords from Hebei
Politicians from Hengshui
Members of the Kuomintang
Sportspeople from Hebei